Gopal Rao or Gopāla Rāo is an Indian name.

 Gopalrao Bajirao Khedkar
 Gopal Rao Ekbote (1912–1994), past Chief Justice of Andhra Pradesh High Court
 Gopalrao Patil
 Rao Gopal Rao (1937–1994), Indian actor